Isaiahh Loudermilk (born October 10, 1997) is an American football defensive end for the Pittsburgh Steelers of the National Football League (NFL). He played college football at Wisconsin.

Professional career
Loudermilk was drafted by the Pittsburgh Steelers in the fifth round, 156th overall, of the 2021 NFL Draft. On May 15, 2021, he signed his four-year rookie contract with Pittsburgh.

NFL career statistics

References

External links
 Wisconsin Badgers bio

Living people
People from Elk County, Kansas
Players of American football from Kansas
American football defensive ends
Wisconsin Badgers football players
Pittsburgh Steelers players
1997 births